Gary F. Morgan (born January 7, 1960) is an American racewalker. He competed in the men's 20 kilometres walk at the 1988 Summer Olympics.

References

External links
 
 

1960 births
Living people
Athletes (track and field) at the 1988 Summer Olympics
American male racewalkers
Olympic track and field athletes of the United States
People from Clarkston, Michigan